Balaji Institute of Modern Management, formerly known as Indian Institute of Modern Management is a private business school in Pune, India under the ages of Sri Balaji university, Pune. Started in the year 1999 by Dr. (Col). A. Balasubramanian. He transformed his dream of starting a management institution of excellence into reality by forming a charitable trust, Sri Balaji Society and laid the foundation stone of the first management institute, The Indian Institute of Modern Management in the last year of the twentieth century, 1999 at the Agrasen High School campus at Yerwada in Pune. Today the institute is among the top 5 best B-schools in Pune and is best in terms of ROI. The institution believes in the 3 D's that is Dedication, Determination and discipline. A institution where Students develop as a corporate giants. In February 2020, Dr. (Col). A. Balasubramanian died. His demise saddened not only the students or his colleague but the whole education societies. His contribution in education industry gave great education foundation not only in pune but all over india and set the principles of great education system with empowerment.

References

https://www.bimmpune.com/

External links
The Balaji Institute of Modern Management Pune Website

Business schools in Maharashtra
Universities and colleges in Pune
Educational institutions established in 1999
1999 establishments in Maharashtra